Lepitsa Peak is the ice-covered peak rising to 1110 m in the northeast foothills of Detroit Plateau on Trinity Peninsula in Graham Land, Antarctica.  It is situated on the west side of Zlidol Gate, surmounting the head of Russell West Glacier to the north, and the upper course of Victory Glacier to the southeast.

The peak is named after the settlement of Lepitsa in Northern Bulgaria.

Location
German-British mapping in 1996.

Maps
 Trinity Peninsula. Scale 1:250000 topographic map No. 5697. Institut für Angewandte Geodäsie and British Antarctic Survey, 1996.
 Antarctic Digital Database (ADD). Scale 1:250000 topographic map of Antarctica. Scientific Committee on Antarctic Research (SCAR), 1993–2016.

References
 Lepitsa Peak. SCAR Composite Antarctic Gazetteer.
 Bulgarian Antarctic Gazetteer. Antarctic Place-names Commission. (details in Bulgarian, basic data in English)

External links
 Lepitsa Peak. Copernix satellite image

Mountains of Trinity Peninsula
Bulgaria and the Antarctic